The Zürich model is the approach by the city of Zürich in Switzerland that permitted its public transportation system to achieve and maintain a high market share. Many other cities have emulated elements of it, especially when new tram systems were introduced.

History
In the 1970s, Zürich was planning to move many of the tram lines in its central area into tunnels. This project was rejected in a referendum. In the 1970s, a project to create an underground railway was similarly rejected.

Despite the failures of these attempts to provide Zürich with a different kind of transportation system, public transportation in Zürich has maintained a high modal split, with 65% of people commuting within the city doing so by public transport and only 17% using cars. In his book, Status Anxiety, Alain de Botton has suggested why the model is so effective:

Elements of the model
A dense network providing many direct connections and short headways.
High priorities at intersections.
Low impact of road congestion on operations.
Parking maximums (instituted in 1989), followed by parking limits in the downtown (1996)

See also
Health impact of light rail systems
Karlsruhe model
Melbourne Principles
Trams in Zürich
Trolleybuses in Zürich
Verkehrsbetriebe Zürich
Zürcher Verkehrsverbund
Zürich S-Bahn

References

Public transport in Switzerland
Transport in Zürich
Transportation planning